Tony Pickard (born 13 September 1934) is a British former tennis player turned coach. He is best known as the longtime coach of former world No. 1 Stefan Edberg.

Pickard captained the Great Britain Davis Cup team led by Tim Henman, and was Greg Rusedski's coach in 1997-98.  Has also coached Anne Keothavong

References

External links
 

1934 births
Living people
British male tennis players
English tennis coaches
Place of birth missing (living people)